Gawdat al-Malt (July 1935 - , Arabic: جودت الملط)  is a retired Egyptian judge and former head of the State Council (Administrative Court) and former chairman of the top public finance and anti-corruption watchdog, the Central Audit Organization (1999 and 2011, Arabic:الجهاز المركزي للمحاسبات ). 

Controversial figure

Al-Malt headed the CAO during the last third of Hosni Mubarak's three decade rule, resigning in March 2011, one month after Mubarak was deposed in the 2011 Revolution. Almost two months earlier, Al-Malt was falsely reported to have been appointed as Minister of Finance on 31 January 2011 because of his anti-corruption reputation during a last ditch reshuffle to keep Hosni Mubarak in power in the face of rising protests. However, Al-Malt denied the claim, and the post was filled by another person on that day.

Before resigning as head of the CAO, Al-Malt announced that he would be submitting reports to the attorney general on corruption cases involving Mubarak's last Prime Minister Ahmed Nazif and his Information Minister Anas al-Fiqqi proving misappropriation of public funds.

However, Al-Malt was later blamed by a rights organisation for stifling access to information that would allegedly have been vital in prosecuting Mubarak for corruption, leading anti-corruption group Censors Against Corruption comprising former and then-current senior members of the CAO to lodge formal complaints against him with the attorney general.

References

1935 births
Living people
Egyptian judges
Egyptian politicians